Syllepte adductalis is a moth in the family Crambidae. It was described by Francis Walker in 1859. It is found in Sri Lanka and India.

The larvae feed spun up in the leaves of balsam.

References

Moths described in 1859
adductalis
Moths of Sri Lanka
Moths of Asia